The Young Women's Christian Association Building, also known as the Jacques-Miller Office Building, is a historic building in Nashville, Tennessee, USA.

Location
The building is in Nashville, the county seat of Davidson County, Tennessee. It is located downtown, at 211 7th Avenue North, between Church Street and Union Street, opposite the back of the Sheraton Nashville Downtown.

History
The six-storey building was completed in 1911. It was designed in the Georgian Revival architectural style by Shattuck and Hussey, an architectural firm based in Chicago. Inside, there is a large cast-iron neweled staircase. Percy Warner, a prominent Nashville businessman, served as Chairman of the Building Committee. It was dedicated on May 9, 1911.

The building was home to the Nashville chapter of the Young Women's Christian Association. The association offered boarding facilities for Christian women as well as a gymnasium and a job centre. The first floor was home to the Ophelia Clifton Atchison Memorial Library, named for the mother of Nashville banker and philanthropist, John Hill Eakin.

The first chapter of the United Daughters of the Confederacy, Nashville No. 1, rented the Vespers room of the YWCA building from 1917 to 1927 for their meetings.

In 1982, the building was redeveloped as an office building. It was renamed the Jacques-Miller Office Building.

Architectural significance
It has been listed on the National Register of Historic Places since December 16, 1982.

References

Buildings and structures in Nashville, Tennessee
Clubhouses on the National Register of Historic Places in Tennessee
Georgian Revival architecture in Tennessee
Religious buildings and structures completed in 1911
Office buildings completed in 1911
National Register of Historic Places in Nashville, Tennessee